This is a list of characters which appear in the BBC Radio 4 sitcom Cabin Pressure.

Characters
The principal cast, the 4-person crew, is the following:

As part of her divorce settlement, Carolyn Knapp-Shappey (Stephanie Cole) received a mid-size (16 seat) jet aeroplane nicknamed "Gerti" (a "Lockheed McDonnell 312", registration G-ERTI). As a result, she founded her very own single plane charter airline, "MJN Air" ("My Jet Now"), which is crewed by an oddball mixture of characters who fly to cities around the world, encountering a variety of situations. Her company is perpetually on the brink of bankruptcy, and thus she strives to reduce running costs wherever possible and to find more high-value clients to keep the company going. As a former stewardess herself, she often pulls double duty as both administrator and cabin attendant, alongside her grown-up but childish son Arthur, whom she struggles to educate in proper customer care.
The airline's only Captain, Martin Crieff (Benedict Cumberbatch), has wanted to be a pilot since he was six years old (before which he wanted to be an aeroplane). He suffers, however, from a distinct lack of natural ability in that department.  He was rejected by at least one flight school, and had to put himself through the required coursework, barely qualifying for his certificationon his seventh attempt. He took the job with MJN for no salary at all, as long as he could be Captain. He appears to have no outside interests beyond flying. He is a stickler for procedures and regulations, but is more prissy than pompous. At the end of series two he tells Douglas that he survives financially by running a delivery service using the van he inherited from his father (running two different jobs largely explaining the lack of hobbies). This was his only inheritance (apart from a tool kit and multimeter) because his father believed he would waste any money he received trying to become a pilot. He has two siblings, Caitlin, a traffic warden and Simon, a council administrator who often frustrates Martin with his annoying superiority. This isn't helped by his Mother's constant admiration of Simon, often saying that "Simon knows best". According to Carolyn, he is the "safe pilot" in contrast to Douglas's "good pilot".
First Officer Douglas Richardson (Roger Allam) is, on the other hand, a quite competent pilot who worked for Air Englanduntil he was fired for smuggling. He chafes at his subordinate position to Martin, and misses no opportunity to flaunt his superiority in the younger pilot's face. In later episodes, it is revealed that Douglas, ashamed of his second-rate job, dresses in Captain's uniform for his wife Helena's benefit, changing to First Officer's uniform before he gets to work, however this ends when his wife reveals her infidelity and Douglas divorces her, his 3rd divorce overall. Douglas is, however, something of a smooth operator who knows all of the dodges available to airline officers, and enjoys taking part in all of them. According to Carolyn, he is the "good pilot" in contrast to Martin's "safe pilot".
Carolyn's son Arthur Shappey (John Finnemore) is an eager and cheery dimwit aged 29, who is supposed to be the flight attendant but usually manages to get in everyone's way. He is half-English and half-Australian; Carolyn is his English mother, and Gordon, Carolyn's ex-husband, his Australian father (original owner of Gerti). Arthur is a relentless optimist, whose biggest claim to fame is being the inventor (or at least discoverer) of fizzy yoghurt (the recipe for which is yoghurt plus time). He also celebrates Birling day, Birling day eve, Gerti's birthday and Summer Christmas, and is a definite polar bear enthusiast and expert. He is very allergic to dragon fruit and strawberries. However, he has eaten strawberry mousse before, claiming that he does not know there are strawberries in strawberry mousse. His cheerful mannerisms are however affected badly on the rare occasions that he sees his father, of whom he seems very afraid. Intellectually speaking, Arthur is distinctly unintelligent, and has the distinct habit of only describing anything that impresses him as 'brilliant!' However, he is also fiercely protective of his mother, as is shown in the first episode of the second series, when he throws a bowl full of chocolate 'cake' (in reality chocolate pudding with powdered milk) all over his aunt for berating her.

The flight deck crew frequently pass their time by engaging in word games, such as naming Brians of Britain (a pun on the classic quiz show Brain of Britain), making bets that Douglas always wins, playing a game of the travelling lemon (wherein a lemon must be hidden in plain sight among the passengers to be discovered by the next player), or playing "Simon says". All crew members also make humorous cabin addresses, inserting e.g. limericks or titles of Hitchcock films, generally when there are no passengers on board. The highlight of their flight is often the cheese tray, and are angered when they learn (in one of the later episodes), that before it is delivered to them, Carolyn eats the Camembert off it.

A recurring character from Series 3 onwards, Hercules Shipwright (Anthony Head) known as Herc, is a pilot working for Air Caledonia and a long-time acquaintance of Douglas. He often goes on dates with Carolyn, despite her claims otherwise, during which they tease each other. A source of ridicule is his vegetarianism and his phobia of sheep, to the extent that Carolyn flies to Ireland to purchase a stuffed sheep for his birthday present. He is fond of opera, much to Carolyn's dismay.

In the first, third and fourth series, the crew take Mr. Birling (Geoffrey Whitehead), a rich Welshman, to the final match of the Six Nations Rugby Championship. Birling is extremely unpleasant but the crew put up with him due to his large tips. The annual "Birling Day" is always accompanied by Douglas trying to steal Birling's expensive 25-year-old Talisker single-malt whisky.

In the third and fourth series, the crew encounter Gordon Shappey (Timothy West), who is Carolyn's ex-husband, Arthur's father, and Gerti's former owner. He attempts underhanded schemes to gain his plane back. In the finale is revealed that he hid a great deal of his fortune in the gold wiring of Gerti.

In the fourth series and series finale, Martin embarks on a relationship with Princess Theresa of Lichtenstein (Matilda Ziegler). Theresa is openly supportive of Martin's ambitions to work for an airline that actually pays him, and the two form an instant attraction to each other on discovering that they are both interested in planes. She can also be very firm when she needs to be, and stands no nonsense - especially from her younger brother.

Notes

References

Lists of radio characters